The Cruiser and Transport Service was a unit of the United States Navy's Atlantic Fleet during World War I that was responsible for transporting American men and materiel to France.

Composition 
On 1 July 1918, the Cruiser and Transport Force was composed of the following ships:

Cruiser Force 
Rear Admiral Albert Gleaves Commander

Squadron One 
Cruiser Force, Squadron One, was under the command of Rear Admiral Albert Gleaves 

Division One
 Seattle, flagship
 
 
 Huntington

Division Two
 
 Pueblo
 Frederick
 San Diego

Division Three
 
 
 
 

Special Duty

Squadron Two 
Cruiser Force, Squadron Two, was under the command of Rear Admiral Marbury Johnston

Division Four
Cruiser Force, Squadron Two, Division Four, was commanded by Rear Admiral Hilary P. Jones
 , flagship
 
 
 Rochester
 

Division Five
 , flagship
 Denver
 Galveston
 
 Des Moines

Division Six

French Navy warships 

French cruisers of the Naval Division of the Atlantic operating with Cruiser Force under the command of French Rear Admiral Marie Gaston Grout 
 Gloire, flagship
 Marseillaise
 Du Petit-Thouars (sunk by SM U-62, 7 August 1918)

Transport Force

New York Division 
Transport Force, New York Division, was under the command of Rear Admiral Albert Gleaves

 Agamemnon
 
 
 
 
 
 
 Harrisburg
 
 

 
 
 Louisville
 
 
 
 
 
 Mount Vernon
 

 
 Plattsburg
 President Grant

Newport News Division 
Transport Force, Newport News Division, was under the command of Rear Admiral Hilary P. Jones

 
 
 
 Madawaska

Foreign vessels 
Foreign vessels operating with the Transport Force
Newport News Division

  (Italian)
  (Italian)
 HMT Czar (British)
 HMT Czaritza (British)
  (Italian) 

  (Italian)
  (Italian)
  (French)
  (British)

  (French)
  (French)
  (Italian)
  (Brazilian)

Notes

References 
 

United States Navy in the 20th century
Military units and formations of the United States Navy